Siler may refer to the following places in the U.S. state of Kentucky:
Siler, Knox County, Kentucky
Siler, Whitley County, Kentucky